South Korean sibling duo AKMU has released three studio albums, one live album, two extended plays, one single album, and thirteen singles. The duo debuted under YG Entertainment in 2014 after they won the first installment of the K-pop Star series. The duo consists of siblings Lee Chan-hyuk and Lee Su-hyun.

Songs from the group's 2014 debut album Play have more than 6.9 million total downloads. As of January 2018, the duo sold over 23 million digital songs in South Korea.

Albums

Studio albums

Live albums

Single albums

Extended plays

Singles

As lead artist

Collaborations

Promotional singles

As featured artist

Soundtrack appearances

Other charted songs

Music videos

Notes

References 

Discographies of South Korean artists
K-pop music group discographies
Folk music discographies